Lincoln Municipal Airport  is a public use airport in Lincoln County, Kansas, United States. It is owned by the City of Lincoln, also known as Lincoln Center, and located two nautical miles (4 km) northwest of the central business district.

Facilities and aircraft 
Lincoln Municipal Airport covers an area of 80 acres (32 ha) at an elevation of 1,412 feet (430 m) above mean sea level. It has two runways with turf surfaces: 2/20 is 2,700 by 130 feet (823 x 40 m) and 15/33 is 2,700 by 370 feet (823 x 113 m).

For the 12-month period ending October 13, 2010, the airport had 14,300 aircraft operations, an average of 39 per day: 98% general aviation and 2% military. At that time there were six single-engine aircraft based at this airport.

See also 
 List of airports in Kansas

References

External links 
 Lincoln Municipal Airport at Kansas DOT airport directory
 Aerial image as of March 2003 from USGS The National Map
 

Airports in Kansas
Transportation in Lincoln County, Kansas
Buildings and structures in Lincoln County, Kansas